The Quinault Rain Forest is a temperate rain forest, which is part of the Olympic National Park and the Olympic National Forest in the U.S. state of Washington in Grays Harbor and Jefferson Counties. The rain forest is located in the valley formed by the Quinault River and Lake Quinault. The valley is called the "Valley of the Rain Forest Giants" because of the number of record size tree species located there. The largest specimens of Western Red Cedar, Sitka Spruce, Western Hemlock, Alaskan Cedar and Mountain Hemlock  are found in the forest as well as five of the ten largest Douglas-firs. The forest receives an average of 12 feet of rain per year. It is believed to be the area with the greatest number of record size giant tree species in the smallest area in the world. It does have the largest trees in the world outside of the state of California and New Zealand.

Located on the western side of the Olympic Mountains, the Quinault Valley was carved out by a glacier and ends at Lake Quinault.

Quinault Rain Forest is a tourist area with a number of resorts and lodges located on either side of Lake Quinault.

Gallery

References

External links 

 Olympic National Park – Temperate Rain Forests
 Olympic National Forest

Geography of Washington (state)
Forests of Washington (state)
Pacific temperate rainforests
Protected areas of Grays Harbor County, Washington
Protected areas of Jefferson County, Washington
Olympic National Forest
Olympic National Park
Quinault places
Washington placenames of Native American origin